Ervin Wilfred "Sonny" Bishop (born October 1, 1939 in Winner, South Dakota) is a former college and Professional Football player.  An offensive lineman, he played college football at Fresno State University, and played professionally in the American Football League for the Dallas Texans and the Oakland Raiders in 1963, and for the Houston Oilers from 1964 through 1969. Bishop was inducted into the Fresno County Athletic Hall of Fame in 1990.

See also
List of American Football League players

References

1939 births
Living people
People from Tripp County, South Dakota
American football offensive linemen
Fresno State Bulldogs football players
Dallas Texans (AFL) players
Oakland Raiders players
Houston Oilers players
American Football League All-Star players
American Football League players
Players of American football from South Dakota